Voir la mer is a 2011 French road comedy-drama film written and directed by Patrice Leconte, and starring Nicolas Giraud, Clément Sibony and Pauline Lefèvre. It was released in France on 4 May 2011 by Océan Films.

Synopsis
Two young brothers from Montbard, Nicolas and Clément, decide to spend their summer holidays travelling across France in a mobile home to visit their ailing mother in Saint-Jean-de-Luz. While on the road, they meet a free-spirited young woman named Prudence, eventually resulting in a love triangle.

Cast
 Nicolas Giraud as Nicolas
 Clément Sibony as Clément
  as Prudence
  as Max
 Jacques Mathou as Jacky Novion, the stuntman
 Urbain Cancelier as barrel truck driver
  as Clément's ex
  as jewelry store clerk
 Jean-Claude Aubrun as garage boss
  as Arthur Chaix (uncredited)

Production
The film was shot from 23 August to 1 September 2010 in the French cities of Biarritz, Ciboure and Saint-Jean-de-Luz.

References

External links
 
 

2011 films
2011 romantic comedy-drama films
2010s French films
2010s French-language films
2010s road comedy-drama films
Films about brothers
Films set in France
Films shot in France
France 2 Cinéma films
French road comedy-drama films
French romantic comedy-drama films
StudioCanal films